St Michael and All Angels Church, Penwerris is a parish church of the Church of England located in Penwerris, near Falmouth, Cornwall. The church is Anglo-Catholic and under the care of the Bishop of Ebbsfleet rather than the diocesan bishop.

The church was originally dedicated to the Holy Trinity, but this was later changed to St Michael & All Angels. It is a plain rectangular building of stone erected in 1827 and opened on 9 January 1828. It consists of a nave only and a western gallery. Penwerris only became a parish in 1848; until then it was part of the parish of Budock.

Organ
The church has a two-manual pipe organ by Hele & Co dating from 1889. A specification of the organ can be found in the National Pipe Organ Register.

References

Church of England church buildings in Cornwall
Anglo-Catholic church buildings in Cornwall
Buildings and structures in Falmouth, Cornwall
Commissioners' church buildings